Tinajo is a municipality in the western part of the island of Lanzarote in the Province of Las Palmas in the Canary Islands, Spain. The municipality is located on the island's northwestern coast and is northwest of the island's capital, Arrecife. The main town in the municipality is Tinajo.

Historical population

Settlements 
The following settlements are located within the municipality of Tinajo:
 El Cuchillo
 Mancha Blanca
 La Santa
 Tinajo
 La Vegueta

Sites of interest 
The Timanfaya National Park (created in 1974) covers the southwestern part of the municipality and is where most of its volcanoes are located. The park features volcanoes and rugged lands. The rest of the park is in the municipality of Yaiza.

The chapel of Our Lady of Dolours (Virgen de los Dolores), the patron saint of the island of Lanzarote, is located in Mancha Blanca, within the municipality of Tinajo.

See also 
 List of municipalities in Las Palmas

References

External links 

Municipalities in Lanzarote